Hannes Tiedemann (1833 – January 22, 1908) was an American banker who became president and co-founder of Union Banking & Savings Co. of Cleveland, Ohio, after immigrating to the United States from Germany.

Tiedemann is most known for his commission of the historic Franklin Castle (aka "Hannes Tiedemann House" or "Tiedemann House") in 1881.  The property has been notoriously catalogued as one of the top fifty most haunted houses in America, and one of the most haunted sites in Ohio.

Early years 
Tiedemann, was born in Prussia, and emigrated from Germany to New York in 1848 with his family – his mother, Wiebka (also spelled Wiebeka), his brothers, Claus and Ludwig, and his sisters, Catharina, Rebecca Eliese, and Lowiese.  His father had died in 1846.

Businesses 
By about 1850, Tiedemann worked as an apprentice to a barrel maker, which relocated him to Royalton, Ohio. He moved to Cleveland around 1855 and worked as a clerk for Babcock & Hurd, a wholesale grocer, and resided at Bennett Forest City House, a rooming house at Cleveland's Public Square.  In 1864, Tiedemann was a wholesale grocer in the firm of Weidemann & Tiedemann, having begun the business with John Christian Weiderman. In 1871, Tiedemann sold out his interests in Weideman & Tiedemann, though he retained business offices within its building.  In 1883, Tiedemann founded and was Vice-President of Savings & Trust Co., newly permitted at that time by Ohio state law to form as a trust company.  In January 1907, he retired from United Savings and Banking Co. of Cleveland, where he had become president, following his involvement in many Cleveland area banks.

Personal life 
In 1862, Tiedemann married Luisa (also referred to as Louise or Louisa) Höck (also spelled Hook or Hoeck).

The Tiedemann family consisted of Hannes, his wife, Luisa, his mother, Wiebka, and six children: Wilhelmine Hanna (died in infancy), August Johannes (survived to adulthood), Emma (died at 15), Ernst (died in infancy), Dora Louise (survived to adulthood), and Albert (died in infancy), though it is alleged that Tiedemann also fathered another child, named Herbert, with a woman named Ella May Clark.

After losing his wife, Luisa, in 1895 to liver failure, Tiedemann remarried. His second wife was named Henrietta.  This subsequent marriage led to rumors regarding Luisa's purported cause of death. Tiedemann's second marriage ended in divorce after one year.

Tiedemann died on January 22, 1908, following a massive stroke he suffered while on a walk in a park, though it has been claimed that he died due to complications relating to Arterial Sclerosis.

Franklin Castle ("Tiedemann House") and Stone Castle 
In late 1880, Tiedemann built two houses. Although it was named "Stone Castle", the first house was not constructed of stone and did not resemble a castle either. It was built in the popular half-timbered Tudor-revival style of the time.

His second home, also known as the "Franklin Castle", was named after the road on which it was built.

References 

1833 births
1908 deaths
Businesspeople from Cleveland
American bankers
Prussian emigrants to the United States
19th-century American businesspeople